Léa Labrousse (born ) is a French individual and synchronised trampolinist, representing her nation at international competitions.

Career
After her international debut in 2009, she made her senior international debut for the French national team in 2014. She competed at world championships, including at the 2014 and 2015 Trampoline World Championships.

Personal
She lives in Chamalières, France.

References

External links
 
 http://www.lemonde.fr/sport/article/2013/10/18/lea-labrousse-vise-le-grand-bond-qui-la-propulsera-a-rio_3497868_3242.html
 http://www.chamalieres-gym.com/accueil_saison_2015_-_2016-1.html
 https://www.youtube.com/watch?v=O7cNFl1S1rs

1997 births
Living people
French female trampolinists
Place of birth missing (living people)
Gymnasts at the 2014 Summer Youth Olympics
Gymnasts at the 2019 European Games
European Games medalists in gymnastics
European Games gold medalists for France
Gymnasts at the 2020 Summer Olympics
21st-century French women